James Riley (born October 27, 1982) is an American soccer player who plays as a defender. Riley previously spent eleven seasons in Major League Soccer (MLS) with the New England Revolution (2005–2007), San Jose Earthquakes (2008), Seattle Sounders FC (2009–2011), Chivas USA (2012), D.C. United (2013), LA Galaxy (2014), and the Colorado Rapids (2015). Riley served as the captain of the Cascadia National Team in the 2018 ConIFA World Football Cup.

Playing career

College and Amateur
Riley played college soccer at Wake Forest University, and in the USL Premier Development League with both Carolina Dynamo and his hometown team, Colorado Springs Blizzard.

Professional
New England Revolution drafted Riley in the second round of the 2005 MLS SuperDraft, and he acquitted himself well in his rookie season, playing various positions and scoring a goal. He continued to keep himself in the mix in defense, starting the majority of the games in 2006 and 2007.

Riley was selected by the San Jose Earthquakes in the 2007 MLS Expansion Draft and subsequently made 24 appearances for the team before being taken by the Seattle Sounders FC in the 2008 MLS Expansion Draft. He stayed with Seattle through the 2011 season, helping the club win three consecutive U.S. Open Cup championships.

Riley was left exposed by Seattle in the 2011 MLS Expansion Draft and he was selected by expansion side Montreal Impact in the November 23, 2011 draft. He was then immediately traded with allocation money to Chivas USA for Justin Braun and Gerson Mayen. Riley was traded to D.C. United on February 14, 2013 for a 2015 Supplemental Draft pick. The trade was later described as being part of a "systematic expulsion of players" at Chivas USA who did not fit the parent club's Mexican-only policy.

Riley won his 5th US Open Cup title in 2013 with D.C. United.  In the sixth minute of stoppage time there was on open header in the box from Álvaro Saborío that Riley was able to deflect onto the cross bar to prevent extra time.

After his release from D.C. United, Riley trialled with and was eventually signed by LA Galaxy as a free agent.

On March 6, 2015, he signed with Colorado Rapids.  During the 2015 season, Riley made 17 appearances in all competitions, scoring a lone goal on May 8, 2015 against former club San Jose in the third minute of stoppage time to salvage a 1–1 draw. The Rapids declined their option on Riley on December 3, 2015.

Riley returned to professional soccer on October 5, 2018, signing with the Tacoma Stars of the Major Arena Soccer League.

Retirement and beyond
Riley formally announced his retirement as an active player on June 23, 2016. One month prior, he had been appointed MLS's director of player relations, a position that had been vacant since Ali Curtis became the New York Red Bulls sporting director in December 2014. In April 2018, it was announced that Riley would take a position on the broadcast team for the Seattle Sounders and their USL affiliate team, Seattle Sounders FC 2.

On May 1, 2018, he was announced as the captain for the Cascadia official soccer team to compete at the 2018 ConIFA World Football Cup in London.

Personal life

Riley was born in Colorado Springs, Colorado, to an African American father and a Korean mother. His parents divorced a year after he was born. Riley and his sister were raised by his mother in Colorado Springs where he graduated from Harrison High School.

Career statistics

Club

Honors

New England Revolution
Lamar Hunt U.S. Open Cup: 2007
Major League Soccer Eastern Conference Championship: 2005, 2006, 2007

Seattle Sounders FC
Lamar Hunt U.S. Open Cup: 2009, 2010, 2011

D.C. United
Lamar Hunt U.S. Open Cup: 2013

LA Galaxy
MLS Cup: 2014

Individual
 Prost Amerika's Sounders FC Player of the Year 2009
 MLS W.O.R.K.S. Humanitarian of the Month for October 2010

References

External links

 

1982 births
Living people
African-American soccer players
American soccer players
Wake Forest Demon Deacons men's soccer players
North Carolina Fusion U23 players
Colorado Springs Blizzard players
New England Revolution players
San Jose Earthquakes players
Seattle Sounders FC players
Chivas USA players
D.C. United players
LA Galaxy players
Colorado Rapids players
American sportspeople of Korean descent
Soccer players from Colorado
New England Revolution draft picks
USL League Two players
Major League Soccer players
Association football defenders
Tacoma Stars (2003–) players
Major Arena Soccer League players
21st-century African-American sportspeople
20th-century African-American people